Orvin Geovanny Cabrera Girón (20 February 1977 – 28 September 2010) was a Honduran football player who played at both professional and international levels as a striker.

Club career
Born in La Lima, Cabrera began his professional career in 1995, and played for Real España, Olimpia, Marathón, Salvadoran outfit Luis Ángel Firpo and Vida. He retired in 2009 due to illness.

International career
Nicknamed Pato (Duck), Cabrera played at the 1995 FIFA World Youth Championship, making two appearances including a 7-1 demolition by Holland in which game he was sent off.

He also once appeared for the Honduran senior team, scoring one goal in a May 2000 friendly match against Canada.

Death
Cabrera died in San Pedro Sula on 28 September 2010, following a two-year battle with kidney cancer. During his illness, his wife was robbed of money meant to cover his treatment costs.

He left behind his wife Narlin Morales and their two children, Nayelhy and Orvin.

References

External links

1977 births
2010 deaths
Deaths from kidney cancer
Deaths from cancer in Honduras
People from Cortés Department
Association football forwards
Honduran footballers
Honduras international footballers
Liga Nacional de Fútbol Profesional de Honduras players
Real C.D. España players
C.D. Olimpia players
C.D. Luis Ángel Firpo footballers
C.D. Marathón players
C.D.S. Vida players
Honduran expatriate footballers
Expatriate footballers in El Salvador